Dance Around the Golden Calf is an oil on canvas painting by German Danish painter Emil Nolde, created in 1910. It is held at the Pinakothek der Moderne, in Munich.

History and description
Nolde found an interest for religious inspired work shortly before making this painting and created several Biblical themed paintings. This work depicts an event from the book of Exodus, when the Israelites believing that Moses might not return from Mount Sinai, created a golden calf to represent the God that had taken them from Egypt. Nolde took inspiration from this episode and creates here a work that where the main protagonists, depicted in the foreground, are some women, naked or half-naked, who appear dancing franticly and lustfully, and without any moral, to celebrate the pagan idol. The colors chosen by Nolde echo those of the fauvist painters, and also of Vincent van Gogh and Paul Gauguin. The primitivism of the work seems to be reminiscent of Gauguin in particular.

Kay Larson states that the painting "exhibits deep emotional complexity. The women flinging up their heels in the picture's center are meant to be wanton and lustful; their skirts rise high above their thighs, yet the revelers seem oblivious to the gazes of male onlookers."

References

1910 paintings
Paintings by Emil Nolde
Golden calf
Paintings in the collection of the Pinakothek der Moderne